Everything You Want for Christmas is the fifth studio album by Big Bad Voodoo Daddy. "Rockabilly Christmas", "Is Zat' You Santa Claus?", and "Christmastime in Tinseltown" previously appeared on the band's first EP, 1997's Watchu' Want for Christmas?.

Track listing
All songs written by Scotty Morris, except where noted. 
Rockabilly Christmas - 3:26
Merry Christmas Baby (Lou Baxter, Johnny Moore) - 3:03
Mr. Heatmiser (Maury Laws, Jules Bass) - 4:22
Blue Christmas (Bill Hayes, Jay Johnson) - 3:55
Last Night (I Went Out with Santa Claus) - 3:48
Christmastime in Tinseltown - 4:32
A Party for Santa (Robert Nelson) - 2:52
Jingle Bells (Cha Cha) (James Pierpont) - 3:27
Is Zat' You Santa Claus? (Jack Fox) - 3:18
We Three Kings (John Henry Hopkins Jr.) - 3:00
Jingle Bells (Salsa Funk Version) (Hidden track) - 2:11

Personnel
Big Bad Voodoo Daddy
Scotty Morris - vocals, guitar
Karl Hunter - clarinet, soprano saxophone, tenor saxophone
Andy Rowley - baritone saxophone, background vocals
Glen "The Kid" Marhevka - trumpet, cornet
Joshua Levy - piano
Ruben Estrada - vibraphone
Ronnie Manaog - marimba, glockenspiel, timpani, wood block, jingle bell
Dirk Shumaker - acoustic bass, vocals, background vocals
Kurt Sodergren - drums

Additional personnel
Ryan Freeland - audio mixer

References

2004 Christmas albums
Big Bad Voodoo Daddy albums
Christmas albums by American artists
Swing Christmas albums
Vanguard Records albums